Villamar, Mara (Marsh) de Arbarei in sardinian language,  is a comune (municipality) in the Province of South Sardinia in the Italian region Sardinia, located about  northwest of Cagliari and about  northeast of Sanluri.

Villamar borders the following municipalities: Furtei, Guasila, Las Plassas, Lunamatrona, Pauli Arbarei, Sanluri, Segariu, Villanovafranca.

References

External links

 Official website

Cities and towns in Sardinia